KFSL-LP is a Classic Country formatted broadcast radio station. The station is licensed to and serving Fossil in Oregon. KFSL-LP is owned and operated by Wheeler County Broadcasters Association.

History
The Fossil School District 21J, which originally launched the station back in 2005, donated the station to the Wheeler County Broadcasters Association on June 4, 2021.

References

External links
 99.5 KFSL Online
 

2005 establishments in Oregon
Classic country radio stations in the United States
Radio stations established in 2005
FSL-LP
FSL-LP
Wheeler County, Oregon